David Kenneth Harbour (born April 10, 1975) is an American actor. He has played supporting roles in films such as War of the Worlds (2005), Awake (2007), Revolutionary Road (2008), W.E. (2011), Knife Fight (2012), Parkland (2013), A Walk Among the Tombstones (2014), Black Mass (2015), Suicide Squad (2016), Sleepless (2017), and No Sudden Move (2021). He gained global recognition for his portrayal of Jim Hopper in the Netflix science fiction drama series Stranger Things (2016–present), for which he received a Critics' Choice Television Award in 2018, two Emmy Award nominations and a Golden Globe Award nomination. He played the title character in Hellboy (2019), Red Guardian in Marvel Studios' Black Widow (2021), and Santa Claus in Violent Night (2022). He will star in Marvel's upcoming Thunderbolts (2024).

Early life
Harbour was born in White Plains, New York, to Kenneth and Nancy (née Riley) Harbour, both of whom work in real estate—his mother in residential and his father in commercial. He attended Byram Hills High School in Armonk, New York, along with actors Sean Maher and Eyal Podell. He graduated from Dartmouth College in Hanover, New Hampshire in 1997, where he majored in drama and Italian and was a member of the Sigma Phi Epsilon fraternity.

Career

Harbour began acting professionally on Broadway in 1999, in the revival of The Rainmaker. He made his television debut that year on Law & Order, playing a waiter. He appeared again in 2002 in an episode of Law & Order: Special Victims Unit, playing a child murderer. He had the recurring role of MI6 agent Roger Anderson in the ABC series Pan Am. In 2005, he was nominated for a Tony Award for his performance in a production of Who's Afraid of Virginia Woolf?.

Harbour is also known for his role as CIA Agent Gregg Beam in Quantum of Solace, as Shep Campbell in Revolutionary Road, and as Russell Crowe's source in State of Play. He also received praise for his role as spree killer Paul Devildis in a 2009 episode of Law & Order: Criminal Intent. His other film credits include Brokeback Mountain, The Green Hornet, End of Watch, and Between Us. In 2013, he had a small role of a head doctor in the television series Elementary. From 2012 to 2014, he also had the recurring role of Elliot Hirsch in The Newsroom.

In 2014, Harbour played the recurring character of Dr. Reed Akley in the first season of the historical drama series Manhattan. In he was cast as Chief Jim Hopper in the Netflix science fiction horror series Stranger Things. For that role, he has received nominations for the Primetime Emmy Award for Outstanding Supporting Actor in a Drama Series (2017 and 2018) and the Golden Globe Award for Best Supporting Actor – Series, Miniseries or Television Film (2018). He won a Screen Actors Guild Award for Outstanding Performance by an Ensemble in a Drama Series (2017) along with the rest of the cast.

Harbour starred as the title character in the superhero reboot film Hellboy (2019). He most recently portrayed Alexei Shostakov/Red Guardian in the Marvel Cinematic Universe (MCU) film Black Widow (2021), and will reprise the role in the upcoming Thunderbolts (2024).

Personal life
Harbour had relationships with Alison Sudol and Julia Stiles. Since 2019, he has been in a relationship with singer Lily Allen. They made their red carpet debut during the 26th annual Screen Actors Guild Awards. The next day they obtained their marriage license, attended by Allen's two daughters, and married on September 7, 2020 in Las Vegas in a wedding officiated by an Elvis impersonator. The couple share a Brownstone in Brooklyn and worked with the architect Ben Bischoff.

Harbour previously followed several religions, including Catholicism and Buddhism. He is a former believer in the paranormal.

In an interview with The Guardian on his role in Black Widow in July 2021, Harbour said he was a socialist: "I don't know that there's anyone who could disagree with socialist ideology"; and later, "The idea of a kindergarten-type society where we share things is my ideal society—as opposed to this world where we're hunting and killing and destroying for our own personal hoarding, our own personal greed."

Harbour struggled with alcoholism in his past and has been sober since his early twenties. He began drinking as a teenager and the habit worsened during college. He decided to stop drinking after feeling "very lonely and needing a different direction in my life", and has said, "I enjoy consciousness too much now" to drink again.

At age 26, Harbour was diagnosed with bipolar disorder.

Filmography

Film

Short Film

Television

Theatre

Awards and nominations

References

External links

 
 
 

1975 births
Living people
20th-century American male actors
21st-century American male actors
American male film actors
American male Shakespearean actors
American male stage actors
American male television actors
Dartmouth College alumni
Male actors from New York (state)
People from White Plains, New York
People with bipolar disorder
American socialists